Simon Finnigan (born 8 December 1981) is a rugby league coach and former player who was most recently the head coach of the Widnes Vikings in Betfred Championship and was previously head coach at Newcastle Thunder and an assistant coach at the Toronto Wolfpack. An Ireland international , he played in the Super League for the Widnes Vikings, Salford City Reds, Bradford Bulls and the Huddersfield Giants, and in the Championship for the Leigh Centurions.

Background
Simon Finnigan was born in Warrington, Cheshire, England, he grew up in Australia, playing for the Penrith Panthers junior teams before joining Widnes Vikings in 2003.

Club career
Finnigan played three season in Super League for Widnes Vikings, before leaving following the club's relegation at the end of the 2005 Super League season. He subsequently joined Salford City Reds, where he played for two seasons before again leaving when the club was relegated at the end of the 2007 Super League season. He signed for Bradford Bulls in September 2007 and stayed for one year before joining Huddersfield Giants in 2009. He rejoined Widnes Vikings in 2011, before finishing his career with Leigh Centurions in 2013. He announced his retirement from the sport in January 2014.

Representative
He was named in the Ireland training squad for the 2008 Rugby League World Cup, and the Ireland squad for the 2008 Rugby League World Cup.

He was again named in the Ireland squad for the 2013 Rugby League World Cup, and made two appearances in the tournament, his final rugby league match being Ireland's defeat against Australia.

Statistics

Club career (Super League)

Representative career

Coaching career
After retiring as a player, Finnigan moved into coaching become assistant coach at the Toronto Wolfpack. In 20219 he became head coach of Newcastle Thunder then in League 1, the third tier of rugby league in the United Kingdom.

Finnigan was appointed the head coach of the Widnes Vikings in the Championship (the second tier) in November 2020 but left the club in April 2022 by "mutual consent".

References

External links
Toronto Wolfpack profile
Statistics at rugbyleagueproject.org
(archived by web.archive.org) Bradford Bulls profile
(archived by web.archive.org) Ireland profile

1981 births
Living people
Bradford Bulls players
English rugby league players
English people of Irish descent
Huddersfield Giants players
Ireland national rugby league team players
Leigh Leopards players
Newcastle Thunder coaches
Rugby league locks
Rugby league players from Warrington
Rugby league second-rows
Salford Red Devils players
Toronto Wolfpack coaches
Widnes Vikings coaches
Widnes Vikings players